The expansion ratio of a liquefied and cryogenic substance is the volume of a given amount of that substance in liquid form compared to the volume of the same amount of substance in gaseous form, at room temperature and normal atmospheric pressure.

If a sufficient amount of liquid is vaporized within a closed container, it produces pressures that can rupture the pressure vessel. Hence the use of pressure relief valves and vent valves are important.

The expansion ratio of liquefied and cryogenic from the boiling point to ambient is:
nitrogen – 1 to 696
liquid helium – 1 to 745
argon – 1 to 842
liquid hydrogen – 1 to 850
liquid oxygen – 1 to 860
neon – Neon has the highest expansion ratio with 1 to 1445.

See also
Liquid-to-gas ratio
Boiling liquid expanding vapor explosion
Thermal expansion

References

External links
cryogenic-gas-hazards

Cryogenics